Stefan Petrović (born 24 January 1990) is a Serbian footballer.

References

External links
 
 Stefan Petrović Stats at utakmica.rs

1990 births
Living people
Sportspeople from Kragujevac
Serbian SuperLiga players
FK Radnički 1923 players
FK Spartak Subotica players
FK Jedinstvo Užice players
FK Sloga Petrovac na Mlavi players
FK Jagodina players
Association football midfielders
Serbian footballers